Erra  (stylized in all caps) is the fifth studio album by American progressive metalcore band Erra. It was released on March 19, 2021 through UNFD. The album was produced by Carson Slovak and Grant McFarland. It is the band's first studio release with the label and the last album to feature guitarist Sean Price before he left the band in March 2022.

Background and promotion
On August 27, 2020, the band announced that they had parted ways with Sumerian Records and signed with UNFD, and they released a new single "Snowblood" along with a corresponding music video. On November 19, the band released another single "House of Glass".

On January 13, 2021, the band released the third single "Divisionary" along with an accompanying music video. At the same time, the band officially announced the album itself, the album cover, the track list, and release date. On February 3, one and a half months before the album's release, the band unveiled the fourth single, "Scorpion Hymn". On March 11, the band released the fifth single, "Shadow Autonomous". On September 10, just under six months after the album's original release, the band released an instrumental version of the album.

On October 7, the band unveiled a new version of the song "Vanish Canvas" featuring Courtney LaPlante of Spiritbox along with its music video. On January 21, 2022, the band released the seventh single "Nigh to Silence" while also announcing the deluxe edition of the album which is set to be released on March 18. At the same time, the band officially revealed the album cover and the track list. On February 23, one month before the release, the band released their cover of Muse's "Stockholm Syndrome" on streaming music services.

Critical reception

Erra received generally positive reviews from critics. Distorted Sound scored the album 8 out of 10 and said: "Undeniably the most pivotal moment of their metalcore span so far – ERRA have delivered the goods when it mattered most. Laser focused on highlighting their pros, this self titled-record makes its incredible production job pay dividends. It's modern metalcore as you know it, but just done really, really well." Metal Injection rated the album 8.5 out of 10 and stated, "Defined by polished experimentation and a breathtaking balance between melody and heaviness, we witness Erra reaching for and finally fully grasping greatness on this self-titled." New Noise gave the album 4 out of 5 and stated: "ERRA is a mesmerizing distillation of ERRA's thirteen-year career, one that boldly refracts and refines the group's sound for the uncertain future ahead."

Rock 'N' Load praised the album saying, "ERRA is, in short, phenomenal. Every single instrument works in perfect unison to create these massive soundscapes that fit effortlessly around the crushing walls of aggressive sound Erra have mastered the creation of. From the opening notes to the closing seconds, I found myself completely absorbed within the evolved sound that Erra has crafted and can recommend this release to metal fans without a single second thought." Wall of Sound gave the album almost a perfect score 9/10 and saying: "Honestly, this album is a HUGE development from their last. It is unpredictable, memorable and precisely executed in every aspect. I think they'll find a lot of their older original fans returning with this album and a huge number of new fans as well. Strong, driving, technical metalcore riffs and melodic undertones are ERRA's bread and butter, but this album really takes all of that to another level."

The album was elected by Loudwire as the 14th best rock/metal album of 2021.

Track listing
Adapted from Apple Music.

Personnel
Erra
 J.T. Cavey – lead vocals
 Jesse Cash – guitar, clean vocals
 Sean Price – guitar, backing vocals
 Conor Hesse – bass, backing vocals
 Alex Ballew – drums, backing vocals

Additional personnel
 Carson Slovak – production, mixing, mastering, recording
 Grant McFarland – production, mixing, mastering, recording
 Josh Johnson – assistant engineering
 Jeff Kardos – artwork, design

Charts

References

2021 albums
Erra (band) albums
UNFD albums